Manuel Beltrán Martinez (born 28 May 1971) is a former professional road bicycle racer from Spain.   His finishes in the Tour de France are somewhat misleading as he was a lieutenant for his team leader. He was the team leader for numerous Vuelta a España rides and performed well.

Beltrán tested positive for EPO after the first stage of the 2008 Tour de France, according to L'Équipe 11 July 2008. The same date as the news broke, a spokesman for his team Liquigas said he would be suspended from the team and thrown out of that year's tour.  It was later confirmed that his B-sample also tested positive.

Beltrán was suspended for two years. In 2010, he had to pay his former team 100.000 euros because of his positive doping test in the Tour de France.

His name was also on the list of doping tests published by the French Senate on 24 July 2013 that were collected during the 1998 Tour de France and found positive for EPO when retested in 2004.

Career achievements

Major results

1996
 10th Overall Tour de Romandie
1997
 4th Overall Vuelta a Aragón
 8th Overall Vuelta a Andalucía
 10th Overall Critérium du Dauphiné Libéré
 10th Overall Vuelta a Murcia
1998
 5th Overall Vuelta a Aragón
 6th Overall Vuelta a Burgos
 7th Overall Vuelta a Asturias
 10th Overall Vuelta a Murcia
1999
 1st  Overall Volta a Catalunya
1st Stage 7 (ITT)
 4th Overall Vuelta a Asturias
 5th Overall Euskal Bizikleta
 7th Overall Vuelta a España
 10th Overall Vuelta a Burgos
2000
 5th Overall Volta a Catalunya
 6th Overall Vuelta a Burgos
2001
 3rd Overall Vuelta a Castilla y León
 3rd Overall Setmana Catalana de Ciclisme
 5th Prueba Villafranca de Ordizia
 8th Overall Tour de Suisse
2002
 2nd Memorial Manuel Galera
 3rd Overall Escalada a Montjuïc
 5th Japan Cup
 9th Overall Vuelta a España
 9th Overall Vuelta a Andalucía
2003
 1st Stage 4 (TTT) Tour de France
 3rd Overall Vuelta a Aragón
 6th Overall Vuelta a España
2004
 Vuelta a España
1st Stage 1 (TTT)
Held  after Stages 5–7
 1st Stage 4 (TTT) Tour de France
 10th La Flèche Wallonne
 10th Klasika Primavera
2005
 1st Stage 4 (TTT) Tour de France
 6th Overall Vuelta a Andalucía
 8th Overall Tour de Romandie
2006
 4th Overall Tour de l'Ain
 9th Overall Vuelta a España
 10th Overall Vuelta a Andalucía
2007
 1st Stage 2 Tour of the Basque Country
 8th Overall Critérium du Dauphiné Libéré
 9th Overall Vuelta a Castilla y León
 9th Overall Vuelta a España

Grand Tour general classification results timeline

See also
 List of doping cases in cycling

References

External links
 The Triki Beltrán blog 

Spanish male cyclists
1971 births
Living people
Doping cases in cycling
Spanish sportspeople in doping cases
Sportspeople from Jaén, Spain
Cyclists from Andalusia